Allagash may refer to:
Allagash River, a tributary of the St. John River
Allagash, Maine, a town in Maine named after the river
Allagash Brewing Company, a brewery in Portland, Maine
Allagash Lake, original source of the Allagash River, diverted to Penobscot River by Telos Cut
Allagash Wilderness Waterway, a state wilderness area in Maine